David Billington (born 15 January 1980, Oxford, England) is a former professional football player who played for Peterborough United and Sheffield Wednesday.

Billington signed for Sheffield Wednesday for £1,000,000 from Peterborough United in April 1997 along with winger Mark McKeever in April 1997. But since then he endured a constant injury nightmare.

He returned to his old club Peterborough in September 2000 on loan in a bid to help him regain fitness following 18 months on the treatment table. But he broke down in his first appearance for the reserves and he was forced to retire from the game in February 2001 at the age 21 due to his knee injuries.

External links

League stats at Neil Brown's site

References

1980 births
Living people
Footballers from Oxford
Peterborough United F.C. players
Sheffield Wednesday F.C. players
Association football defenders
English footballers